KCRV (1370 AM) is a radio station broadcasting a Country music format. Licensed to Caruthersville, Missouri, United States.  The station is currently owned by Pollack Broadcasting Co.

References

External links

Country radio stations in the United States
CRV
Radio stations established in 1978